At the 1924 Summer Olympics in Paris, a single modern pentathlon event was contested. It was the third appearance of the sport; for the third straight time, Sweden swept the medals.

Participating nations
A total of 38 pentathletes from 11 nations competed at the Paris Games:

Results

Shooting

Swimming

Fencing

Equestrian

Athletics

References

External links
 
 
 

 
1924 Summer Olympics events
1924